2007 Meistriliiga was the 17th season of the Meistriliiga, Estonia's premier football league. Levadia won their fifth title.

League table

Relegation play-off

2–2 on aggregate. Kalju won on away goals and were promoted for the 2008 Meistriliiga. Kuressaare were relegated to the 2008 Esiliiga.

Results
Each team played every opponent four times, twice at home and twice on the road, for a total of 36 games.

First half of season

Second half of season

Season statistics

Top scorers

See also
 2007 Esiliiga

References

UEFA.com - Meistriliiga 2007
Soccerassociation.com - Meistriliiga 2007
Soccernet.ee - Meistriliiga 2007 

Meistriliiga seasons
1
Estonia
Estonia